John Warhurst may refer to:
 John Warhurst (athlete)
 John Warhurst (academic)
 John Warhurst (sound editor)